Independence High School was an alternative high school in the historic district of Alpharetta, Georgia, United States. It was located on the old Milton High School campus.

References

External links
Independence High School official website

Educational institutions established in 1991
Alternative schools in the United States
Fulton County School System high schools
1991 establishments in Georgia (U.S. state)